Saint-Brieuc (Breton: Sant-Brieg , Gallo: Saent-Berioec) is a city in the Côtes-d'Armor department in Brittany in northwestern France.

History

Saint-Brieuc is named after a Welsh monk Brioc, who Christianised the region in the 5th century and established an oratory there. Bro Sant-Brieg/Pays de Saint-Brieuc, one of the nine traditional bishoprics of Brittany which were used as administrative areas before the French Revolution, was named after Saint-Brieuc. It also dates from the Middle Ages when the  "pays de Saint Brieuc," or Penteur, was established by Duke Arthur II of Brittany as one of his eight "battles" or administrative regions.

Geography

Overview
The town is located by the English Channel, on the Bay of Saint-Brieuc. Two rivers flow through Saint-Brieuc: the Goued/Gouët and the Gouedig/Gouédic.

Other towns of notable size in the département of Côtes d'Armor are Gwengamp/Guingamp, Dinan, and Lannuon/Lannion all sous-préfectures.

In 2009, large amounts of sea lettuce, a type of algae, washed up on many beaches of Brittany, and when it rotted it emitted dangerous levels of hydrogen sulphide. A horse and some dogs died and a council worker driving a truckload of it fell unconscious at the wheel and died.

Neighboring communes
Langueux, La Méaugon, Plérin, Ploufragan, Trégueux and Trémuson.

Climate
Saint-Brieuc experiences an oceanic climate.

Culture
Saint-Brieuc is one of the towns in Europe that host the IU Honors Program.

The Cemetery of Saint Michel contains graves of several notable Bretons, and sculptures by Paul le Goff and Jean Boucher. Outside the wall is Armel Beaufils's statue of Anatole Le Braz. Le Goff, who was killed with his two brothers in World War I, is also commemorated in a street and with his major sculptural work La forme se dégageant de la matière in the central gardens, which also includes a memorial to him by Jules-Charles Le Bozec and work by Francis Renaud.

The town of St. Brieux in Saskatchewan, Canada is named after Saint-Brieuc of Brittany. It was founded by immigrants from this region in Brittany. It was settled in the early 1900s.

Demographics
Inhabitants of Saint-Brieuc are called Briochins in French.

Breton language
In 2008, 3.98% of primary school children attended bilingual schools.

Transport

The Saint-Brieuc railway station, situated on the Paris–Brest railway, is connected by TGV Atlantique to Paris Montparnasse station, journey time is about 3 hours.

There are no scheduled air services from Saint-Brieuc – Armor Airport.

Personalities
Saint-Brieuc is hometown of many personalities:

 Patrice Carteron (born 1970), footballer
 Octave-Louis Aubert (1870–1950), editor
 Maryvonne Dupureur (1937–2008), athlete, Olympic 800m silver medallist
 Émile Durand (1830–1903), music theorist and teacher
 Léonard Charner (1797–1869), senator and Admiral of France
 Auguste Villiers de l'Isle-Adam (1838–1889), symbolist writer
 Louis Auguste Harel de La Noë (1852–1931), engineer
 Célestin Bouglé (1870–1940), philosopher
 Louis Guilloux (1899–1980), writer
 Henri Nomy (1899–1971), admiral
 Patrick Dewaere (1947–1982), actor
 Kévin Théophile-Catherine (born 1989), footballer
 Louis Rossel (1844–1871) - Army officer and Communard
 Florent Du Bois de Villerabel (1877-1951), archbishop forced to resign after France's liberation in World War II
 Mamadou Wagué (born 1990), footballer
 Raymond Hains (1926–2005), artist
 Anaclet Wamba (1960–), boxer
 Yelle (Julie Budet) (1983–present), musician
 Roland Fichet (1950–present), Author, Philosopher
 Nathan Saliou, Gardener

International relations 
Saint-Brieuc préfecture of the Côtes-d'Armor is twinned with :
 Aberystwyth, Wales
  Agia Paraskevi, Greece
  Alsdorf, Germany
  Goražde, Bosnia and Herzegovina

See also
Diocese of Saint-Brieuc
Communes of the Côtes-d'Armor department
Élie Le Goff Entry for Élie Le Goff a Saint-Brieuc born sculptor
The Saint-Michel cemetery in Saint-Brieuc

References

External links

 City council website 
  saint-brieuc.maville 
  Saint-Brieuc Tourism 

 
Communes of Côtes-d'Armor
Prefectures in France